Katalin Szuchy (born 28 September 1953) is a Hungarian basketball player. She competed in the women's tournament at the 1980 Summer Olympics.

References

1953 births
Living people
Hungarian women's basketball players
Olympic basketball players of Hungary
Basketball players at the 1980 Summer Olympics
Basketball players from Budapest